The 2014–15 Lega Basket Serie A was the 93rd season of the Lega Basket Serie A, the highest professional basketball league in Italy.

The regular season started on 12 October 2014 and finished on 10 May 2015, after all teams had played 30 games each.
The eight best ranked teams advanced to the play-off phase whilst Pasta Reggia Caserta was relegated to the Serie A2 after finishing last in the league table.

The play-offs started on 18 May 2015 and finished on 26 June 2015, Banco di Sardegna Sassari won their first title by beating Grissin Bon Reggio Emilia in game 7 of the finals.

Teams

Season narrative

Supercup
The Italian Supercup opened the season on October 4 and 5 at Sassari's PalaSerradimigni, in a final four format. The previous year's League and cup runners-up Montepaschi Siena (also defending champions) did not participate after declaring bankruptcy over the summer. 
League champions EA7 Emporio Armani Milano comfortably dispatched Enel Brindisi (third in the 2014 cup) 71–59 in the first semifinal on the back of Linas Kleiza's and Joe Ragland's long-distance shooting (17 and 16 points respectively) in a mistake-strewn game.
The other semifinal saw cup-holders Banco di Sardegna Sassari have an easy 89–73 win over Acea Roma (league semifinalist), with the hosts always leading and coach Romeo Sacchetti rotating his squad.

The final saw Sassari add a second title to their prior cup win, downing Milano 96–88.
The Sardinians started the game on the front foot, leading the first quarter 29-14  while Milano struggled to score (0-for-6 from three).
They continued to drive the game at the start of the second quarter but Milano found a way back into the game thanks to stronger defense and a stellar MarShon Brooks to answer with a 15–0 run from 36-18 down, with Sassari then finding their scoring shoes to finish the half 50–40. 
Three's from Ragland and Kleiza helped Milano claw back at the lead but Brooks missed the shot to equalise, with the quarter ending on 72–68.
Sassari would stay in front for the rest of the game, with Supercup MVP Jerome Dyson entertaining the fans.
Brooks led all scorers with 26 points, followed for Milano by Ragland (17) and Kleizia (16) whilst Dyson paced the winners with 25 and three other players had 14 points.

All Star Game
The All Star Game was played on 17 January 2015 in Verona's PalaOlimpia, players from EA7 Emporio Armani Milano were absent as the club was involved in Euroleague games at the same period.
An entertaining defense-free game between Dolomiti Energia and Named Sport sponsored squads finished 146-143 for the latter, with a token appearance by former star player and Named Sport coach Gianmarco Pozzecco at the end of the game. Christian Eyenga was named game MVP whilst Andy Rautins won the three-point contest and the pair of Tony Mitchell and Kader Kam (from freestyle group Da Move) won the dunk contest.

Cup

The Italian Cup was held from 20 to 22 February at the PalaDesio in Desio. Banco di Sardegna Sassari won its second successive title by beating EA7 Emporio Armani Milano 101–94 in the final. David Logan was named the Cup final MVP.

Playoffs
Banco di Sardegna Sassari surprised regular season leaders and competition favourites EA7 Emporio Armani Milano in a semifinal game 7 overtime victory to reach the finals for a historic first time.

Finals

Having won the decisive game 6 after three overtimes, Banco di Sardegna Sassari overcame hosts Grissin Bon Reggio Emilia 73-75 during game 7 at the PalaBigi to win their first ever Serie A title. Sassari's Jerome Dyson's was named Finals MVP.

Regular season

Standings

Results

Statistical leaders

Points

Assists

Steals

Rebounds

Blocks

Valuation

Playoffs

Awards
Most Valuable Player:
 Tony Mitchell (Dolomiti Energia Trento)
Coach of the year:
 Maurizio Buscaglia (Dolomiti Energia Trento)
Best player under 22:
 Simone Fontecchio (Granarolo Bologna)
Executive of the year:
 Salvatore Trainotti (Dolomiti Energia Trento)
Finals MVP:
 Rakim Sanders (Banco di Sardegna Sassari)

References

 
Lega Basket Serie A seasons
1
Italy